Cowe is a surname. Notable people with this surname include:

 Jim Cowe, New Zealand football player
 John Cowe McIntosh (1892–1921), British-born Australian aviator
 Madeline Cowe, Australian TV Host, model, and beauty pageant titleholder
 Richard Cowe, English archdeacon
 S. Peter Cowe, professor Armenian studies
 Simon Cowe (1948–2015), English guitarist
 Steve Cowe (born 1974), English football player

See also
 COWE, Confederation of Women Entrepreneurs
 Sin Cowe Island, Vietnam